Ceandris Nehemiah Brown (born January 27, 1983) is a former American football safety. He was drafted by the Houston Texans in the sixth round of the 2005 NFL Draft. He played college football at Louisiana-Lafayette, and was also enlisted in the Mississippi National Guard. C.C Brown is a member of Rissah Temple 130, AEAONMS, PHA and the Most Worshipful Stringer Grand Lodge, Jurisdiction of Mississippi, F&AM, (PHA).

Brown has also been a member of the New York Giants, Detroit Lions and Jacksonville Jaguars.

Professional career

Houston Texans
Brown was drafted by the Houston Texans in the sixth round of the 2005 NFL Draft. He started in all of his four years with the Texans.

New York Giants
Brown became a free agent in 2009 and signed a one-year deal with the New York Giants. He was tendered to a one-year contract by the Giants following the 2009 NFL season, but the tender was withdrawn after the Giants signed Deon Grant.

Detroit Lions
On May 10, 2010  Brown signed a contract with the Detroit Lions.

Healthcare fraud case
Brown was charged with one count of conspiracy to commit wire fraud and health care fraud, one count of wire fraud, and one count of health care fraud by the United States Department of Justice on December 12, 2019. He initially pleaded not guilty to the charges, but changed his plea to guilty. He was sentenced to 12 months in prison and ordered to pay back $84,777 on June 22, 2020.

References

External links
Houston Texans bio
Detroit Lions Bio

1983 births
Living people
People from Greenwood, Mississippi
American football linebackers
American football safeties
Mississippi Delta Trojans football players
Louisiana Ragin' Cajuns football players
Houston Texans players
New York Giants players
Detroit Lions players
Jacksonville Jaguars players